Ryan Emilie Williams (born February 23, 1996) is an American soccer player who plays as a defender for the North Carolina Courage, a National Women's Soccer League (NWSL) club.

Williams was born in Centennial, Colorado, and attended Cherry Creek High School, winning the 5A state championship as a sophomore. She also played club soccer with the Colorado Rush and became highly ranked in the region for recruiting. She committed to Texas Christian University (TCU) in 2014, playing 80 matches over the span of four years. Williams scored one goal and recorded 15 assists with the Horned Frogs.

After her college career, Williams was drafted by the North Carolina Courage with the 40th pick of the 2018 NWSL College Draft. She played one regular season match as a national team replacement in 2018. In her next season, she started in three matches and made appearances in two more. During her stint with the Courage, the team won the NWSL Shield and the NWSL Championship in both 2018 and 2019.

Early life
Williams was born on February 23, 1996, in Centennial, Colorado, to parents Charles and Lisa. She has five siblings: Bailey, Megan, Charlie, Peter, and Patrick. Williams began playing soccer at four years old, and she played club soccer with an Elite Clubs National League (ECNL) team, the Colorado Rush, as a midfielder. The Rush won the ECNL national championship in the 2011–12 season. In her sophomore year at Cherry Creek High School, Williams was part of the soccer team that won the 2012 5A state championship. As a four-year letterwinner coming out of high school, she was ranked 16th regionally by TopDrawerSoccer.com.

College career
By February 3, 2014, Williams committed to Texas Christian University (TCU), citing her sister, Megan, who was attending the university at the time, and a positive experience at a camp hosted by Eric Bell, the head coach of the women's soccer team. Williams majored in physical education, and she was listed on the Academic Big 12 All-Rookie team in 2014 and 1st-team Academic All-Big 12 from 2015 to 2017.

In 2014, Williams' freshman year, she was converted to a defender, played in 19 matches and started in 18. She made her collegiate debut against Washington State, the Horned Frogs' first opponent of the season, on August 22. Williams got her first assist in a 3–0 win against Abilene Christian on September 7, with Michelle Prokof scoring the goal. The sole game she did not start was against Texas State on September 12, in which she was substituted on in the 63rd minute. Williams recorded another assist against North Texas nine days later. Her contributions helped the team achieve six shutouts and a goals against average of 0.96, and the Horned Frogs finished 8–8–3, with a loss to West Virginia in the quarterfinals of the 2014 Big 12 Conference Women's Soccer Tournament. Williams, who played 1,702 minutes in her first season, was listed as part of the Big 12 All-Newcomer Team on November 3.

Williams started every game in her sophomore year, and improved her form by leading the team with five assists. Two of those assists were against Oral Roberts, leading to a 4–0 win on September 6. Her fifth assist was against Baylor on October 27, leading to the game-tying goal by Mackenzie Koch. She also had a shot that hit the crossbar in overtime. In the 2015 Big 12 Conference Women's Soccer Tournament, TCU was knocked out by Baylor in penalties, ending the season with a record of 8–7–4. The penalty shootout lasted eight rounds, and Williams made her kick during the sixth round.

In 2016, Williams' junior year, she started all 20 games for the Horned Frogs. She assisted the game-winning goal in the season-opener against Maryland Terrapins during overtime on August 19. Her other assist of the season was to Kayla Hill against Austin Peay, en route to a 4–1 win. In the 2016 Big 12 Conference Women's Soccer Tournament, the Horned Frogs beat Kansas 1–0 in the quarterfinals, and Baylor 3–2 in overtime in the semifinals. In the Big 12 Championship, the Horned Frogs lost to West Virginia 3–2 in overtime, after leading 2–0 before halftime. After the conference tournament, TCU qualified for the 2016 NCAA Division I Women's Soccer Tournament for the first time in school history. On November 12, the Horned Frogs were knocked out in the first round by Texas A&M, after falling behind 1–0 early in the match and could not recover.

Williams started in all 22 games in her senior year. In the season opener against Louisiana–Monroe, Williams collected her 10th career assist, leading to a 5–0 win. On August 20, she broke a personal record with three assists against UTSA in a 5–0 victory. Williams returned to her home state of Colorado on August 27, assisting the game-winning goal against Northern Colorado. Her 15th and final collegiate assist was in a 2–1 loss to Northeastern on September 8. In the 2017 Big 12 Conference Women's Soccer Tournament, she made her penalty kicks in back-to-back penalty shootout victories against Kansas and West Virginia. Williams was placed as the fifth penalty kicker by Bell "because we know she's got ice water in her veins." In the Big 12 Championship, Williams scored her first collegiate goal in the 87th minute against Baylor, when a handball was called inside the penalty area, resulting in a penalty kick. The Horned Frogs lost the match 2–1, with Williams scoring the lone goal. With a record of 12–6–3, TCU qualified for the 2017 NCAA Division I Women's Soccer Tournament for the second consecutive season. The Horned Frogs scored their first ever NCAA tournament goal, then allowed two goals to Arizona and lost in the first round. At the end of the season, Williams was listed as part of the 2017 All-Big 12 First Team and the United Soccer Coaches All-South First Team.

After her college career, Williams acknowledged TCU assistant coach Ryan Higgenbotham for helping her improve. She said, "Whenever I would ask, he was there. He was always really honest with me in what I needed to do and really always believed in me and wanted me to do well, and do so successfully. He's also just a good person. He cared as me first as a person, and then as a player."

Club career
Williams was drafted by the North Carolina Courage with the 40th pick of the 2018 NWSL College Draft, becoming the first player from TCU to be drafted into the NWSL. She was added as a defender to the 2018 pre-season roster on March 5, 2018. The Courage did not sign her immediately, as the club retained Williams' NWSL rights. On May 31, Williams was signed as a national team replacement, as some active roster players were on international duty. Williams made her professional debut on June 3 against the Houston Dash, playing 11 minutes in the 1–1 draw. Players on international duty returned to the team on June 15, thus Williams was released as a result, and she was allowed to continue training with the Courage. Williams was signed as a replacement again on July 18, as some players were on international duty for the 2018 Tournament of Nations. On July 26, Williams participated in the 2018 Women's International Champions Cup, substituting on in the 61st minute against Paris Saint-Germain. The Courage advanced into the finals, and they faced Olympique Lyonnais three days later. She made her first start in the finals and protected the 1–0 lead for 80 minutes. Williams did not make another appearance during the 2018 season, and the Courage continued on to win the NWSL Shield and Championship.

On March 8, 2019, Williams and the Courage reached an agreement on a new contract, with coach Paul Riley saying Williams made progress over the year. The Courage announced their 2019 pre-season roster on March 18, with Williams listed as a midfielder. She was moved to a supplemental spot on the 2019 roster, which was released on April 8. On May 12, she played 16 minutes against the Chicago Red Stars as a substitute, replacing midfielder Kristen Hamilton. The Courage lost the game 3–1, their first lost in 330 days. On June 1, Williams made her first NWSL start against Orlando, playing 81 minutes as a defender. She and the rest of the defense helped the team to a 3–0 win. Two weeks later, Williams played for the first half against Portland Thorns FC, before being substituted out for Julia Spetsmark, who scored the game-tying goal. She played her first full match at the Washington Spirit, winning 2–1. Williams did not make an appearance for the rest of the regular season. She was out with an injury in late July, before being upgraded to questionable in mid-August. Williams was out with an ankle injury in mid-October, which lasted to the championship game. After winning the NWSL Shield, the Courage defeated Chicago 4–0 in the championship game, winning their second consecutive NWSL Championship. A contract option was exercised for Williams at the end of the season.

In the 2020 pre-season, Williams was listed as a defender on the roster. Due to the COVID-19 pandemic, the pre-season was suspended by the NWSL on March 12. Williams was disappointed with the timing of the postponement, and she said, "We came here, and we had a really good, hard week of preseason, and we were all super excited to be here...It was so fun to be back, and then obviously it got cut off pretty fast." The NWSL allowed individual training on May 6, and Williams and her roommate Cari Roccaro prepared training videos for other teammates to follow from a far distance. Small group training was allowed by May 25, and a new month-long tournament was announced in place of the beginning of the regular season. Williams remained on the roster ahead of the Challenge Cup, and she recorded her first start of the season on July 5, in a 1–0 win against the Chicago Red Stars. The Courage were knocked out in the quarterfinal round of the Challenge Cup by the Portland Thorns on July 17, losing the match 1–0. Williams remained on the roster for the Fall Series, as one of the seven defenders after loans and opt-outs. She played for four games of the series and recorded her first professional assist in a 4–1 loss against the Houston Dash. After the season, the Courage extended a contract offer to Williams.

In December 2020, Williams signed a one-year contract, including a one-year option, with the Courage. She reported to pre-season training in February 2021 for medical protocols set by the NWSL for the season.

Career statistics

Honors

Club
North Carolina Courage
Women's International Champions Cup: 2018
NWSL Championship: 2018, 2019
NWSL Shield: 2018, 2019

References

External links
 
 Ryan Williams at North Carolina Courage

1996 births
Living people
American women's soccer players
TCU Horned Frogs women's soccer players
North Carolina Courage draft picks
North Carolina Courage players
National Women's Soccer League players
Women's association football defenders
Soccer players from Colorado
People from Centennial, Colorado